Jessie Evans is an American born songwriter, singer, saxophonist, and record producer currently residing in Brazil. On stage, while based out of Berlin, she was often accompanied by Iggy Pop's drummer, Toby Dammit.

Her first solo album Is it fire? was released on her label 'Fantomette Records' in November 2009. The sessions were recorded with drummer Budgie of bands Siouxsie and the Banshees and The Creatures. In 2011, in Berlin, a video collaboration for Black Sand –song from her first album– was released. Among the participants were renowned artists Toby Dammit, King Khan from King Khan and the Shrines and Namosh. The video was directed by Evans and Azul Violeta Bermejo.

Evans' music is a sensual and exotic mix of three different genres : afro-beat, pop and electro.

References

External links
Jessie Evans on my space
Official site
Jessie Evans video Interview for Allomusic

Living people
Year of birth missing (living people)
21st-century American women singers
21st-century American singers